Bar Island is the name of two small islands in the Bay of Fundy, in New Brunswick, Canada.

The southern end of the island is almost contiguous with Fox Island.